Marchman may refer to several people and places:

Houston Marchman, alternative country musician
Rutherford County Airport (Marchman Field), Rutherfordton, North Carolina
F. K. Marchman Technical Center (high school), New Port Richey, Florida